Pogue's Run is an urban creek that starts near the intersection of Elizabeth Street and Lennington Drive on the east side of Indianapolis, Indiana, and empties into the White River south of the Kentucky Avenue bridge over that river. At the stream's intersection with New York Street just east of downtown Indianapolis it enters a double-box culvert conduit through which it flows underneath downtown Indianapolis. It is named for George Pogue, who, along with John Wesley McCormick, were among the first settlers in what would become the city of Indianapolis. Construction of the Pogue's Run Trail along the creek's eastern section has been started.

History
Prior to the arrival of Pogue and McCormick, Native Americans and wildlife would often follow Pogue's Run as a pathway. George Pogue (c.1763–1821) was a blacksmith from Connersville, Indiana. In 1819, he blazed a trail that corresponds with the present-day Brookville Road. On March 2, 1819, he built a cabin for his family of seven where Michigan Street currently crosses Pogue's Run. However, there is some disagreement among historians about these events; Jacob Piatt Dunn wrote in his 1910 work Greater Indianapolis, that Pogue actually arrived on March 2, 1820, and moved into a cabin that had been built in 1819 by a Ute Perkins, who had left before Pogue arrived. Perkins reportedly had left the area because of his loneliness, later settling in Rush County, Indiana.

The creek became known as Pogue's Run after Pogue disappeared in April 1821; it had been called Perkin's Run (after Ute Perkins) prior to Pogue's disappearance.

When Indianapolis was laid out, only Pogue's Run running diagonally across the southeast portion of the "Mile Square" disturbed the orderliness of the grid pattern. Alexander Ralston had to make compromises due to the stream's location within the congressional donation lands given for the future Indianapolis. Before the state government could be moved to Indianapolis from Corydon, fifty dollars was spent to rid swampy Pogue's Run of the mosquitoes that made it a "source of pestilence".

In the so-called Battle of Pogue's Run on May 20, 1863, during the American Civil War, several Democrats leaving the state party convention on the railroad running parallel to Pogue's Run threw various firearms and knives into the creek because Union troops were looking for contraband weapons. Two decades later, in 1882, the Run flooded, killing at least ten people. A covered bridge that once crossed Pogue's Run was eventually destroyed.

Beginning in 1914 and finishing in 1915, a project referred to variously as the "Pogue's Run Drain" and the "Pogue's Run Improvement" led to the stream's submersion beneath downtown Indianapolis from New York Street on the east side to the White River on the west side of the city. The removal of Pogue's Run from the visible landscape in the Mile Square cost well over one million dollars. A number of factors influenced the decision to cover over Pogue's Run, including the economic and human costs from decades of violent flooding, public health risks from diseases, and the stream's unsightly and unpleasant smell due to years of sewage and industrial pollution. The sewering of Pogue's Run also paved the way for railroad track elevations, which alleviated congestion on Indianapolis' ever busier roads.

On the section immediately to the northeast of where Pogue's Run enters downtown Indianapolis, Brookside Park was built to take advantage of the creek as a recreation opportunity.

Today
Indy Parks established the Pogue's Run Trail alongside the creek bed on the section northeast of downtown. New sections of trail are being planned for construction to connect the Pogue's Run Trail to downtown. The trail will run from the Monon Trail at 10th Street along the creek to the Pogues Run Art and Nature Park a few blocks west of Emerson Avenue. A major impediment to completion of the project is the Nowland Avenue bridge across Pogues Run that connects Spades Park and Brookside Park. The bridge, built in 1909, is currently closed due to its dilapidated condition. It is a concrete Luten arch bridge designed by local engineer Daniel B. Luten. It is on the state of Indiana's inventory of historic bridges and is a component of the Indianapolis Park and Boulevard System district on the National Register of Historic Places. Neighborhood groups are leading efforts to rehabilitate the bridge and complete the trail.

Wildlife found on the path include ducks, geese, and red-winged blackbirds, with herons sometimes seen as well. Goose excrement is a particular problem for those who hike along Pogue's Run.

A project named "Charting Pogue's Run" marks where the creek once ran in downtown Indianapolis. A blue line, made of thirty permanent steel medallions and a semi-permanent blue thermoplastic line, "meanders" across roads and parking lots. The blue line's location shows that Pogue's Run now lies under both Lucas Oil Stadium and Bankers Life Fieldhouse.

In popular culture
The movie Twice Under (1987) about a Vietnam veteran "tunnel rat" terrorizing a city was partially shot in the underground portion of Pogue's Run between New York and Washington streets. The underground portion of Pogue's Run is a significant feature in Ben Winters' 2016 book, Underground Airlines, and in John Green's 2017 book, Turtles All the Way Down.

See also
List of rivers of Indiana

References

External links

 Urban trekkers seek to uncover mystery of Pogue's Run Indianapolis Star
 Pogue's Run Atlas Obscura

History of Indianapolis
Rivers of Marion County, Indiana
Rivers of Indiana